Paul Deliège (21 January 1931 – 7 July 2005) was a Belgian artist and writer of comics. He is most famous for his series Bobo.

Biography
Deliège was born in Olne. He started in the daily Le Soir with Père Bricole et Félicien et les Romanis. In 1959, he got into éditions Dupuis where he launched les aventures de Théophile et Philibert with Vicq. at the start of the 1960s, he was the principal creator of the Mini-récits (mini-stories) in the magazine Spirou, where he created Bobo, his best-known hero. The series Les Krostons, about three green imps and their unsuccessful attempts to take over the world, (with Piroton) and  Le trou du souffleur (The souffleur's hole) followed shortly. Deliège was also writer for the series Sam et l'Ours (Sam and the bear, drawn by Lagas) and some stories of Sybilline (drawn by Macherot).

The Krostons is being made into a 3-D film of the same name.

Deliège died of a heart attack in 2005.

Notes

References

Paul Deliège at Bedetheque 
Paul Deliège at BD Oubliées 
Paul Deliège at Lambiek's Comiclopedia

External links
 Les Krostons at BD Oubliées 
 Le blog des Krostons 
 Krostons film site

Interviews

 Interview, Auracan 

1931 births
2005 deaths
Belgian comics writers
Belgian comics artists
Belgian humorists
People from Olne